Holsten Pils is a German brand of lager, a pilsner, brewed in the UK in the Mungo district of Northampton by Carlsberg Group.

History
It was first developed in the north of West Germany in 1953.

Carlsberg bought Holsten Brewery (Holsten-Brauerei AG) in 2004 for around 300 million euros.

Production
It contains water, malted barley, glucose syrup and hops. In Germany it is known as Holsten Pilsener and is 4.8% alcohol by volume. 

Production of Holsten Pils began in Northampton on Tuesday 1 November 2005.

In May 2006 Carlsberg launched a draught version of Holsten Pils in a 30-litre keg. Each can has the motto Pure Brewing Excellence.

See also
 Beer in England
 Beer in Germany

References

1953 establishments in West Germany
Beer brands of Germany
Carlsberg Group
Economy of Northamptonshire
Northampton
Products introduced in 1953